The Museum of American Pottery is located in Cedar Creek Gallery in Creedmoor, North Carolina, in a climate controlled room.

The museum came into existence after an exhibit called "Old Pots" premièred at Cedar Creek Gallery in the early 1970s.  The collection has since grown to over 400 pieces. The museum celebrates the American potter and "the humble pieces of pottery which continue to inspire and enrich our lives today."

References

External links

Museums with year of establishment missing
Ceramics museums in the United States
Museums of American art
American art pottery
Museums in Granville County, North Carolina